Stolk or Van Stolk is a Dutch toponymic surname. Stolk is a contracted form of Stolwijk, a town in South Holland.  People with the surname include:
Carlos Eduardo Stolk (1912–1995), Venezuelan lawyer, diplomat and business magnate; son of Teunis Stolk
Jan van Stolk (1920–1997), Dutch ceramist
Jimmy Leonard Stolk (born 1942), Surinamese soldier, entrepreneur, and murder suspect
Kyle Stolk (born 1996), South-Africa-born Dutch swimmer
 (1946–2001), Dutch political activist and printer
Roy Stolk (born 1979), Dutch snooker player
Vanderson Stolk Francisco (born 1987), Brazilian football defender
 (1950–2011), Dutch phantasy writer who used the pseudonym "W.J. Maryson"

See also
, collection of Dutch history-related engravings and maps founded by Abraham van Stolk (1814–1896)
Stolk, small community in Northern Germany

References

md mujibur rhoman mr
}}

Dutch-language surnames
Toponymic surnames